The , also known as , is a monorail line serving the cities of Naha and Urasoe, Okinawa, Japan. Yui Rail is the first rail line on Okinawa since World War II. As Okinawa is the island of Japan lying farthest to the south and west that has an active rail line, Akamine Station and Naha Airport Station, the southernmost and westernmost rail stations in Japan respectively, lie on this line. It uses the OKICA as its contactless smart card, and integrates with  Suica and other major Japanese IC cards (such as ICOCA or SUGOCA) from 10 March 2020.

Yui Rail 
The monorail's "Yui Rail" brand name and logo were selected in a public competition. The average distance between stations is 0.93 kilometers. It takes 37 minutes and costs ¥370 to traverse its 17 km length.

Trains (made by Hitachi Rail and Kawasaki Heavy Industries Rolling Stock Company under the former's monorail lineup) are made up of two cars, with 65 seats and a total capacity of 165 people. Trains run on an elevated track between 8 and 20 meters above the ground, with a top speed of 65 km/h (about 40 mph) and an actual average speed of 28 km/h (17 mph) counting stops.

Urasoe Extension
After lengthy deliberation of possible route options, the monorail corporation applied for construction permission for a 4.1-kilometer, 4-station extension from Shuri Station to Tedako-Uranishi Station (Urasoe City) in August 2011. Permission was granted on 26 January 2012, with construction planned to start in March 2013. Revenue operation along the extension started on 1 October 2019, using a revised schedule with extended rush hour headways for opening day.

Preliminary ridership data from the first week showed that year-on-year ridership was up after the extension opened on Oct. 1.

Stations

See also
Monorails in Japan
List of rapid transit systems
Rail transportation in Okinawa

References

External links

Official website 
Official website 
Yui Rail Museum 

Monorails
Alweg people movers
Monorails in Japan
Rail transport in Okinawa Prefecture
Naha
Airport rail links in Japan
Japanese third-sector railway lines
Railway lines opened in 2003
Railway companies established in 2003
2003 establishments in Japan